Egg Island may refer to the following places:

In Australia
 Egg Island, Horseshoe Reef, Tasmania
 Egg Islands, Huon River, Tasmania

In The Bahamas:
 Egg Island (Bahamas)

In Canada:
Egg Island (Manitoba), an island on the northeastern coast of the province Manitoba
Egg Island Ecological Reserve, an ecological reserve in Lake Athabasca, Alberta

In the United States:
 Egg Island (Alaska), an island in the Fox Islands subgroup of the Aleutian Islands
 Egg Islands (Alaska), a group of three islands off the south-central coast of Alaska
 Egg Island (Georgia)

In Antarctica:
 Egg Island (Antarctica)

See also
Eigg